Pradeep Rawat may refer to:
Pradeep Kumar Rawat, Indian diplomat
Pradeep Rawat (politician) (born 1956), Indian politician
Pradeep Rawat (actor), Indian actor